The Scheibe SF-24 Motorspatz is a West German high-wing, single-seat motor glider that was designed by Egon Scheibe and produced by Scheibe Flugzeugbau.

Derived from the unpowered Scheibe Spatz, the Motor Spatz was described in 1983 by Soaring Magazine as "one of the more primitive of the breed of self-launching sailplanes".

Design and development
The Motorspatz was an early attempt to create a self-launching glider. Scheibe accomplished this by mounting a Hirth engine in the nose of a mostly stock Spatz glider.

The SF-24 is constructed with a welded steel tube fuselage that mounts the monowheel landing gear, with a small tail wheel for ground maneuvering. The wings and tail surfaces are built with wooden structures and covered in doped aircraft fabric covering. The wing has a  span, employs an Mu 14% airfoil and mounts spoilers for glidepath control.

The aircraft was not type certified and 50 were built.

Operational history
In July 2011 there were two Motorspatz registered in the United States with the Federal Aviation Administration, including one SF-24 in the Experimental - Exhibition category and one SF-24B in the Experimental - Research and Development category.

Variants
SF-24
Initial version
SF-24A
Improved version
SF-24B
Improved version

Specifications (SF-24)

See also

References

1960s German sailplanes
Scheibe aircraft
Single-engined tractor aircraft
High-wing aircraft
Motor gliders
Aircraft first flown in 1960